Papenkov is a rural locality (a khutor) in Beloselskoye Rural Settlement of Koshekhablsky District, Adygea, Russia. The population was 26 as of 2018. There are 2 streets.

Geography 
Papenkov is located 10 km south of Krasnogvardeyskoye (the district's administrative centre) by road. Mirny is the nearest rural locality.

References 

Rural localities in Koshekhablsky District